Winfree Observatory  is an astronomical observatory owned and operated by Randolph College. Built in 1900 and named after Maj. C.V. Winfree, it is located in Lynchburg,  Virginia (USA).

See also 
List of observatories

References
 

Astronomical observatories in Virginia
Buildings and structures in Lynchburg, Virginia